For the town in Germany, see Habichtswald, Hesse.

The Habichtswald is a small mountain range, covering some 35 km2 and rising to a height of 615 m, immediately west of the city of Kassel in northern Hesse in Germany.

The bulk of the range is a nature reserve.  The remainder lies within the city limits of Kassel and is partly settled.  The castle and park of Wilhelmshöhe are located within the Habichtswald.

Mountain ranges of Hesse
!Habichtswald